We Do Not Negotiate With Terrorists was a post-punk indie rock band originally from Salford in the UK, but relocated to Gothenburg, Sweden. The band signed to Loud Attic Records in September, 2012 and released the single "Big If" on 28 September 2012. The single is notable for being used on seven separate Volvo TV commercials from August 2013 onwards.

References

Musical groups from Greater Manchester
Music in Salford
Swedish indie rock groups
English indie rock groups
Post-punk revival music groups